Fletcher Island is a rocky island,  in diameter, which is the largest of the Fletcher Islands. Fletcher Island was discovered by the Australian Antarctic Expedition (AAE) (1911–1914) under Douglas Mawson, who named it for Frank D. Fletcher, First Officer on the expedition ship Aurora.

See also
 Composite Antarctic Gazetteer
 Fletcher Islands
 List of Antarctic and sub-Antarctic islands
 List of Antarctic islands south of 60° S
 SCAR
 Territorial claims in Antarctica

References

Islands of George V Land